Tiffany Dabek Davis (born March 14, 1980) is a former professional tennis player from the United States.

Biography
Born in Los Angeles, Dabek later moved to Bradenton, Florida and was a top ranked junior in the state.

Dabek, a right-handed player, started competing on the professional tour in the 1998 season. In 2001 she qualified for the main draw of two WTA Tour tournaments, the Morocco Open in Casablanca and the Tournoi de Québec. The following year she qualified a second time in Casablanca. She won both the singles and doubles titles at the $25,000 ITF tournament in Raleigh, North Carolina in 2003. Her biggest performance came at the 2005 US Open where she made it through the qualifying draw, with wins over Kateřina Böhmová, Tsvetana Pironkova and Maria Fernanda Alves, all in three set matches. In the opening round of the main draw she was beaten by seeded Russian Vera Dushevina. She peaked at 170 in the world rankings after the US Open and continued on tour until 2007.

She is a qualified dietician and was formerly a teaching pro at River Strand Golf and Country Club.

ITF finals

Singles (5–3)

Doubles (4–4)

References

External links
 
 

1980 births
Living people
American female tennis players
Sportspeople from Bradenton, Florida
Tennis people from Florida
21st-century American women